Podjelovo Brdo is a dispersed settlement in the Škofja Loka Hills, west of Gorenja Vas, in the Municipality of Gorenja Vas–Poljane in the Upper Carniola region of Slovenia.

References

External links 
Podjelovo Brdo on Geopedia

Populated places in the Municipality of Gorenja vas-Poljane